Guillaume Du Fay (c. 1397–1474) was a French composer and music theorist.

Dufay or du Fay may also refer to:

People
 Charles François de Cisternay du Fay (1698–1739), French chemist
 Claude Dufay (1926–2001), French entomologist, see Argyrogrammatini
 Jean Dufay (1896–1967), French astronomer
 Dufay (crater), a crater on the moon named after Jean Dufay
 Marie-Guite Dufay (born 1949), French politician
 Rick Dufay (born 1952), French-American guitarist, Aerosmith
 DuFay A. Fuller (1852–1924), American businessman and politician

Toponyms
Dufay River, a tributary of lake Buies, in Québec, Canada

See also
 Dufay Collective, an early-music ensemble from the United Kingdom, specializing in Medieval and Renaissance music and named after Guillaume Dufay
 Dufaycolor, an additive color process for motion pictures